Prince of Wales Public School may refer to various schools in Ontario, Canada:

 Prince of Wales Public School (Barrie), an elementary school 1876–2011
 Prince of Wales Elementary school, Belleville, Ontario
 Prince of Wales Public School (Brockville), an elementary school in Brockville, Ontario
 Prince of Wales Public School (Peterborough, Ontario), JK–8
 Prince of Wales Elementary School, Hamilton, Ontario

See also 
 Prince of Wales School (Freetown, Sierra Leone), a secondary school in Freetown, Sierra Leone
 Nairobi School, formerly known as Prince of Wales School, a secondary school in Nairobi, Kenya
 Prince of Wales Secondary School, a public secondary school in Vancouver, British Columbia, Canada